Abhay is a ZEE5 Original Indian Hindi-language psychological crime thriller web series. Produced by B. P. Singh under Fiction Factory Productions, and directed by Ken Ghosh, the series marks the digital debut of Bollywood actor Kunal Khemu, who stars alongside Elnaaz Norouzi, Sandeepa Dhar and Namit Das. The series revolves around officer Abhay Pratap Singh, an investigating officer with the mind of a criminal, who can go to any extent to solve a case. The first season comprised eight episodes and was released on ZEE5 on 7 February 2019.

Abhay 2 saw  returning as the protagonist while Ram Kapoor and Chunky Pandey were seen playing the antagonist in the series.  Besides them, the second season also stars Bidita Bag, Raghav Juyal, Indraneil Sengupta and Asheema Vadaan. Abhay 2 is produced by B.P. Singh, and directed by Ghosh was released on the same OTT platform on 14 August 2020.

Abhay Season 3, which released on ZEE5 on 8 April 2022, sees the stakes getting higher with Abhay facing a new unknown threat. Kunal Kemmu plays Abhay Pratap Singh with admirable composure in the eight-part crime thriller.

Season 1 
The story revolves around the life of SP Abhay Pratap Singh who solves different cases along with his team which includes Inspector Komal and some other officers. He has a son named Saahil towards whom Abhay is overprotective due to Abhay's past which includes officer Natasha and her informer Govind. Govind is back to take his revenge from Abhay who was the reason behind Govind's family's death. Will Abhay be able to solve all the cases? Or will he lose to Govind's quest for vengeance?

Season 2 
Set within a year after the events of the first season, Abhay continues to hunt vile murderers and monster with his trademark ingenuity, and novel deductions until an enigmatic criminal mastermind, with no name or past, turns his world upside down and traps him along with everyone else in a maze that will test the very fibre of Abhay's morality. He plays the villain's game better than the villain could have expected but still the game does what it is meant to. The Villain lies & tries to corrupt Abhay. It starts getting to Abhay, the pressure of saving the kids and his past secrets make him vulnerable, but even by the end he remains incorruptible

Season 3 
Abhay (Season 3) about Abhay facing a new unknown threat, a dark force capable of exploiting anyone in the name of a twisted belief. Abhay must now crackdown on more than just criminality. Abhay is in a mess of his own life and cannot forget the setbacks he has endured. Abhay Pratap Singh is the hunter and hunted in his third coming. This makes him even more fascinating.

Cast

Main (Season 1) 
 Kunal Khemu as SP Abhay Pratap Singh
 Sandeepa Dhar as Inspector Komal
 Elnaaz Norouzi as Officer Natasha
 Namit Das as Govind
 Priyal Gor as Divya Singh (Abhay's wife)
 Maninee Mishra as Radhika

Main (Season 2) 
 Kunal Khemu as Superintendent of Police Abhay Pratap Singh; Sonam Khanna's boyfriend
 Asha Negi as Sonam Khanna (news reporter); Abhay Pratap Singh's girlfriend
 Ram Kapoor as Kidnapper - dead (bomb blast)
 Nidhi Singh as Khushboo
 Chunky Pandey as Harsh 
 Asheema Vadaan as Mira 
 Bidita Bag as Saloni

Main (Season 3) 

 Kunal Khemu as Abhay
 Vijay Raaz as Mrityu
 Asha Negi as Sonam
 Rahul Dev as Avtar
 Tanuj Virwani as Kabir
 Divya Agarwal as Harleen
 Nidhi Singh as Khushboo
 Vidya Malvade as Nidhi

Recurring 

 Raghav Juyal as Sameer
 Manini Mishra as Radhika
 Rituraj Singh as Kuldeep Dhingra (KD)
 Pratyaksh Panwar as Saahil
 Devendar Chaudhury as Sandeep Awasthi 
 Nitish Pandey as Pandey Ji
 Deepak Tijori as Chander Singh (Episode 1)
 Gopal Singh as Rawat (Episode 1)
 Sangeeta Panwar as Chuttan Bai (Episode 1)
 Dua Fatima as Pooja (Episode 1)
 Arav Shukla as Raghu (Episode 1)
 Anshuman Jha as Pramod (Episode 2)
 Yashashri Masurkar as Surbhi (Episode 2)
 Basant Kumar as Charan (Episode 2)
 Anupriya Goenka as Supriya (Episode 3)
 Manraj Singh as Rohit (Episode 3)
 Praveen Tiwari as Dushyant (Episode 3)
 Utpal Dashora as Param (Episode 3)
 Kiran Joneja as Manda (Episode 4)
 Ravi Khanvilkar as Manda's Assistant (Episode 4)
 Aayaam Mehta as Officer Srivastava (Episode 4)
 Alisha Chaudhary as Aanchal (Episode 4)
 Guddu Rana as Aghori (Episode 4)
 Prashant Bhargava as Driver (Episode 4)
 Mukesh Rishi as Babu Bhaiyya (Episode 5 and 6)
 Harsh Mayar as Sujay (Episode 5 and 6)
 Naved Aslam as Senior Officer (Episode 5 and 6)
 Rana Sengar as Sugreev (Episode 7)
 Ivan Rodrigues as Channel Head (Episode 7)
 Prashant Narayanan as Jaykrishan (Episode 7 and 8)
 Saurabh Nayyar as Forensic Expert (Episode 7 and 8)
 Geetanjali Mishra as Salini
 Imran Nazir Khan as DJ yoko

 Ahmad Harhash as Raj Singh Verma

Episodes

Season 1

Season 2

Controversy 
The Abhay 2 web series, starring Kunal Khemu in the lead, became a controversial one for showing Indian Bengali freedom fighter Khudiram Bose, as a ‘criminal’ in one of its episode. 
Netizens had criticized the makers of the web series for disrespecting him.

Zee5 apologized after using Bose's photograph on a criminal board in the web series Abhay 2.

References

External links
 

Indian drama television series
2019 Indian television series debuts
Law enforcement in fiction
Police procedural television series
ZEE5 original programming